Beira Baixa ("Lower Beira") was a Portuguese province. It was abolished with the Constitution of 1976.

Municipalities
The 13 municipalities in the province:
Belmonte - Castelo Branco District - Cova da Beira Subregion
Castelo Branco - Castelo Branco District - Beira Interior Sul Subregion
Covilhã Municipality - Castelo Branco District - Cova da Beira Subregion
Fundão Municipality - Castelo Branco District - Cova da Beira Subregion
Idanha-a-Nova Municipality - Castelo Branco District - Beira Interior Sul Subregion
Mação Municipality - Santarém District Pinhal Interior Sul Subregion
Oleiros Municipality - Castelo Branco District - Pinhal Interior Sul Subregion
Pampilhosa da Serra Municipality - Coimbra District - Pinhal Interior Norte Subregion
Penamacor Municipality - Castelo Branco District - Beira Interior Sul Subregion
Proença-a-Nova Municipality - Castelo Branco District - Pinhal Interior Sul Subregion
Sertã Municipality - Castelo Branco District - Pinhal Interior Sul Subregion
Vila de Rei Municipality - Castelo Branco District - Pinhal Interior Sul Subregion
Vila Velha de Ródão Municipality - Castelo Branco District - Beira Interior Sul Subregion

External links

1936 establishments in Portugal
1976 disestablishments in Portugal
Provinces of Portugal (1936–1976)